EGB Forces (Specialized Army Forces with Expanded Capabilities)  (German: Spezialisierte Kräfte des Heeres mit Erweiterter Grundbefähigung) is a specialized operations force of the German Bundeswehr, organized under the Rapid Forces Division.

Background 
In 2007 EGB Forces were established as a light infantry unit to close the gap between conventional infantry units and the Kommando Spezialkräfte.
Therefore, each of the four paratrooper battalions established one specialized company to serve as an enhanced-skilled company. These battalions are now two regiments with companies.

In 2015 the specialized reconnaissance unit Fernspählehrkompanie 200 was merged with parts of the reconnaissance platoons of the brigade's recce companies.

Selection and training 
Personnel of all branches of the Bundeswehr may apply for the EGB Forces.

Prerequisites
 Minimum of four years of enlistment
 Completion of basic training and occupational specific training
 Completed security clearance
 Excellent physical fitness

Selection process 

Completion of several tests which include an obstacle course, ruck march, swimming tests and numerous tests of physical or mental stamina. Successful completion of the selection process is followed by training for the occupation in the EGB Forces in the special operations school in Pfullendorf.

Training
Before serving in the EGB Forces, soldiers attend a six-month training cycle which includes 
 Advanced training in firearms
 Specialized infantry tactics
 Combatives
 Medical training
 SERE training

Upon completion of the training cycle, soldiers are awarded with the EGB Forces qualification badge and receive the Combat-Ready-status. Afterwards they are assigned to an EGB company.

During their career, soldiers of EGB Forces may receive advanced training in communications, weapons training, demolitions, advanced medical training, mountain training or training in amphibious operations.

Mission and deployments 

Tasks of EGB forces may include
 Personnel recovery
 Quick reaction force
 Direct action
 Assistance of national or international special operations forces

Since their establishment EGB Forces were involved in Afghanistan as part of the International Security Assistance Force, the United Nations Multidimensional Integrated Stabilization Mission in Mali and as part of a capacity building mission in northern Iraq.

See also 
 United States Army Rangers

References 

Special forces of Germany
Airborne units and formations of Germany
Units and formations of the German Army (1956–present)